Cryptocarya erythroxylon  is a medium to large rainforest tree, that grows from the Barrington Tops in New South Wales to the Gladstone area in Queensland.  The common name is the pigeonberry ash, rose maple, or rose walnut.

This is one of the largest laurels in Australia. Mature specimens usually reach around 35 metres tall, though there is a 57 metre tall tree at Murray Scrub near Kyogle close to the NSW–Queensland border. It grows between 500 and 1050 m altitude.

Trees of the genus Cryptocarya are mostly from the tropics or warmer temperate areas. This tree is unusual as it grows in cooler regions, subject to frost and rare snowfall. It is also an unusually tall member of the genus.

The trunk is often buttressed, and the grey or white cylindrical trunk is a conspicuous feature in the rainforest. Leaves are 6 to 13 centimetres long, white and veiny underneath. The small cream flowers form in early summer, the fruit is a black drupe maturing in the cooler months. Germination occurs easily after removal of the black aril.

References

 Floyd, Alexander G., Rainforest Trees of Mainland South-eastern Australia, Inkata Press 1989,  page 175

Flora of Queensland
Flora of New South Wales
erythroxylon
Laurales of Australia
Trees of Australia
Trees of mild maritime climate